The 1989 African Women's Handball Championship was the eighth edition of the African Women's Handball Championship, held in Algeria from 17 to 27 July 1989. It acted as the African qualifying tournament for the 1990 World Women's Handball Championship.

Preliminary round

Group A

Group B

Knockout stage

Bracket

Semifinals

Third place game

Final

Final ranking

External links
Results on todor66.com

1989 Women
African Women's Handball Championship
African Women's Handball Championship
1989 in Algerian sport
1989 in African handball
Women's handball in Algeria
July 1989 sports events in Africa
1989 in African women's sport